Hudson Franklin was a contemporary art gallery in New York City owned by Nicole Francis.

Exhibited artists include: Alice Könitz, Andreas Fischer and Jamisen Ogg.

History
Hudson Franklin closed on July 24, 2009.

References

External links
 hudson franklin website

Defunct art museums and galleries in Manhattan
Art galleries disestablished in 2009
2009 disestablishments in New York (state)